The 2020–21 UT Arlington Mavericks men's basketball team represented the University of Texas at Arlington in the 2020–21 NCAA Division I men's basketball season. The Mavericks, led by third-year head coach Chris Ogden, played their home games at the College Park Center in Arlington, Texas as members of the Sun Belt Conference. With the creation of divisions to cut down on travel due to the COVID-19 pandemic, they played in the West Division.

Previous season
The Mavericks finished the 2019–20 season 14–18, 10–10 in Sun Belt play to finish seventh place. They lost in the first round of the Sun Belt tournament to Coastal Carolina.

Roster

Schedule and results

|-
!colspan=12 style=| Non-conference regular season

|-
!colspan=9 style=| Sun Belt Conference regular season

|-
!colspan=12 style=| Sun Belt tournament
|-

|-

Source

References

UT Arlington Mavericks men's basketball seasons
UT Arlington Mavericks
UT Arlington Mavericks men's basketball
UT Arlington Mavericks men's basketball